The Japan national under-18 baseball team is the national under-18 team representing Japan in international baseball competitions. The organization is currently ranked 1st in the world by the World Baseball Softball Confederation. They compete in the bi-annual U-18 Baseball World Cup. They have finished 2nd in the tournament four times.

Competitive record

See also
 Japan national baseball team
 Baseball Federation of Japan
 U-18 Baseball World Cup

References

National under-18
National under-18 baseball teams
Baseball under-18